Elewijt Castle, also known as "Castle of Het Steen" or "Rubenskasteel", is a castle in Elewijt, Belgium, which was owned by Peter Paul Rubens from 1635 to his death in 1640, and features in some of his paintings. Elewijt Castle is situated at an altitude of 11 meters.

Nowadays, the castle is privately owned, not open for visits but rented for events.

Sources

See also
List of castles in Belgium
Elewijt Castle on BALaT - Belgian Art Links and Tools (KIK-IRPA)

Castles in Belgium
Castles in Flemish Brabant
Peter Paul Rubens